Saba Saudagar is an Indian film and television actress. She is known for her roles in Hindi language web-series including Booo Sabki Phategi (2019), Crackdown (2020), and Gandii Baat (season 4) (2020).

Career
Saba played one of the lead roles in the 2018 Indian film The Reunion. She rose to prominence with her role in the 2019 web-series Booo Sabki Phategi. She appeared in a pivotal role in Apoorva Lakhia's spy thriller web series Crackdown (2020), in which she acted as Fawzia. Her role was well received by audiences.

Filmography
 The Reunion (2018)
 Booo Sabki Phategi (2019)
 Crackdown (2020)
 Gandii Baat (Season 4) (2020)

References

External links
 Official website
 

Living people
Actresses in Hindi cinema
Indian actresses
Year of birth missing (living people)